Al Ahli Saida Sports Club is a football club based in Sidon, Lebanon, that competes in the . Ahli Saida last competed in the Lebanese Premier League in the 2007–08 season, where they were relegated after finishing in 12th position.

Stadium
Home matches are normally played in the Saida Municipal Stadium, which can hold up to 22,000 supporters.

Honours
 Lebanese Second Division
 Winners (2): 1996–97, 2008–09

See also 
 List of football clubs in Lebanon

References

Al Ahli Saida SC
Football clubs in Lebanon